Emma Johanna Laine (born 26 March 1986) is a former tennis player from Finland.

Laine won 11 singles and 44 doubles titles on the ITF Women's Circuit. On 7 August 2006, she reached her best singles ranking of world No. 50. On 30 October 2006, she peaked at No. 64 in the doubles rankings.

Playing for Finland Fed Cup team, Laine has a win–loss record of 56–21.

Biography
Emma's mother Erika was a swimmer, while her father Erkki Laine was an ice hockey player, winning a silver medal at the 1988 Winter Olympics. Emma was born in Sweden because Erkki was playing there at the time. He died in 2009.

Emma was introduced to tennis at age five by her parents. She is a baseliner who prefers hardcourts. She is coached by Olli Leppänen. She travels on tour with her coach or her sister (and best friend) Essi Laine, who also is a professional player.

ITF finals

Singles (11–10)

Doubles (44–22)

References

External links
 
 
 

1986 births
Living people
Sportspeople from Karlstad
Sportspeople from Helsinki
Finnish female tennis players
20th-century Finnish women
21st-century Finnish women